Qatiq is a fermented milk product from the Turkic countries. It is considered a more solid form of yogurt than ayran. 

In order to make qatiq, boiled milk is fermented for 6–10 hours in a warm place. Sometimes red beets or cherries are used for colouring. The product may be kept in a cool place for two or three days. If stored longer, it will turn sour; it may still be added to high-fat soups, though. The chalop soup is made from qatiq in Uzbekistan.

When sour milk is strained in a canvas bag, the resulting product is called suzma. Dried suzma, or kurut, is often rolled into marble-size balls.

Etymology 
Some of the local names include: катык in Russia, katık in Turkey, qatıq in Azerbaijan, qatiq in Uzbekistan, қатық in Kazakhstan, gatyk in Turkmenistan. It is known as къатыкъ among the Crimean Tatars and as қатиқ among the Uyghurs. In Bulgaria, катък is  a spread that has the consistency of mayonnaise.

See also 
 Cacık – a cognate name applied to another dish in Turkey and some neighbouring countries
 List of dairy products
 List of yogurt-based dishes and beverages

References 

Yogurts
Azerbaijani cuisine
Bulgarian cuisine
Kazakhstani cuisine
Tatar cuisine
Turkish cuisine
Turkmenistan cuisine
Uzbekistani cuisine
Turkish words and phrases